1767 Lampland, provisional designation , is an Eoan asteroid from the outer regions of the asteroid belt, approximately 15 kilometers in diameter. It was discovered on 7 September 1962, by astronomers of the Indiana Asteroid Program at Goethe Link Observatory in Indiana, United States. The asteroid was named after American astronomer Carl Lampland.

Orbit and classification 

Lampland a member the Eos family, the largest asteroid family in the outer main belt consisting of nearly 10,000 asteroids. It orbits the Sun at a distance of 2.7–3.3 AU once every 5 years and 3 months (1,915 days). Its orbit has an eccentricity of 0.10 and an inclination of 10° with respect to the ecliptic.

The body's observation arc begins with a precovery at Palomar Observatory in August 1951, more than 11 years prior to its official discovery observation at Goethe Link.

Physical characteristics 

In the Tholen classification, its spectral type is ambiguous, closest to the X-type asteroid and with some resemblance to the C-type asteroids, while the overall spectral type of the Eos family is that of a K-type.

Rotation period 

As of 2017, no rotational lightcurve of Lampland has been obtained from photometric observations. The asteroid's rotation period, poles and shape remain unknown.

Diameter and albedo 

According to the survey carried out by the NEOWISE mission of NASA's Wide-field Infrared Survey Explorer, Lampland measures 15.448 kilometers in diameter  and its surface has an albedo of 0.116.

Naming 

This minor planet was named after American astronomer Carl Lampland (1873–1951), a graduate of Indiana University, best known for his radiometric measurements of planetary temperatures.

Lampland is also honored by a lunar and by a Martian crater. The name was proposed by Frank K. Edmondson, who initiated the Indiana Asteroid Program. The official  was published by the Minor Planet Center on 20 February 1971.

References

External links 
 Asteroid Lightcurve Database (LCDB), query form (info )
 Dictionary of Minor Planet Names, Google books
 Asteroids and comets rotation curves, CdR – Observatoire de Genève, Raoul Behrend
 Discovery Circumstances: Numbered Minor Planets (1)-(5000) – Minor Planet Center
 
 

001767
001767
Named minor planets
001767
19620907